In crystallography, an anti-structure is obtained from a salt structure by exchanging anion and cation positions.  

For instance, calcium fluoride, CaF2, crystallizes in a cubic motif called the fluorite structure. The same crystal structure is found in numerous ionic compounds with formula AB2, such as ceria (CeO2), zirconia (cubic ZrO2), uranium dioxide (UO2). In the corresponding anti-structure, called the antifluorite structure, anions and cations are swapped, such as beryllium carbide (Be2C) or lithium oxide (Li2O), potassium sulfate (K2SO4).

Other anti-structures include:
 anti-SnO2: Ti2N
 anti-PbCl2: Co2P
 anti-CdCl2: Co2N
 anti-CdI2: Cs2O
 anti-NbS2: Hf2S
 anti-ReO3: Cu3N
 anti-LaF3: Cu3P, Cu3As

References

Crystallography